John Blackwelder Nowell Jr. (born 1962) is a retired vice admiral in the United States Navy. Nowell assumed duties as the navy's 59th Chief of Naval Personnel on May 24, 2019. Nowell is a distinguished graduate of the United States Naval Academy with a Bachelor of Science in Ocean Engineering and holds a Master of Science in Weapons Systems Engineering from the Naval Postgraduate School.

Naval career
Nowell's operational tours have spanned the Atlantic and Pacific Fleets to include forward deployed naval forces in Europe and the Western Pacific.

Nowell's staff assignments included tours on the staff of the Chief of Naval Operations in the Surface Warfare Directorate (N86), and executive assistant to the Director of Theater Air Warfare (N865); chief of the Theater Air and Missile Defense Branch (J-38); head of the Washington Placement Branch (PERS-441), executive assistant to the Commander, Navy Personnel Command/Naval Personnel Development Command, and director, Surface Warfare Distribution Division (PERS-41).  Nowell also served as director of the Navy Senate Liaison Office in Washington D.C.

As a flag officer, Nowell served as chief of staff and director, Strategy, Resources, and Plans (N5/8) on the staff of Commander, United States Naval Forces Europe and Africa/U.S. Sixth Fleet in Naples, Italy; Commander, Amphibious Force Seventh Fleet/Expeditionary Strike Group Seven/Task Force 76 in Okinawa, Japan, and most recently as director, Military Personnel Plans and Policy (OPNAV N13).

Nowell assumed duties as the 59th Chief of Naval Personnel on May 24, 2019. Serving concurrently as the deputy chief of naval operations (manpower, personnel, training and education) (N1), he was responsible for the planning and programming of all manpower, personnel, training and education resources for the United States Navy. As CNP, he led more than 26,000 people engaged in the recruiting, talent management, training and development of Navy personnel. His responsibilities included overseeing Navy Recruiting Command, Navy Personnel Command and Naval Education and Training Command. He relinquished the position to Vice Admiral Richard Cheeseman Jr. on June 3, 2022.

Nowell's awards include the Navy Distinguished Service Medal, Legion of Merit (six awards), Bronze Star Medal, and various other personal, unit and campaign awards. Every ship that he has been assigned to has won the Battle Efficiency "E" award, and USS Porter (DDG 78) also won the Anti-Submarine Warfare "Bloodhound" award. Nowell was also the recipient of the 1987 Pacific Fleet Junior Officer Shiphandling Award.

References

|-

|-

1962 births
Living people
Place of birth missing (living people)
United States Naval Academy alumni
United States Navy personnel of the Gulf War
Naval Postgraduate School alumni
Recipients of the Legion of Merit
United States Navy admirals
Recipients of the Navy Distinguished Service Medal